The Kaskel and Kaskel Building was a building at 316 Fifth Avenue, near 32nd Street, in the NoMad/Koreatown neighborhood of Manhattan, New York City. It was completed in 1902 and demolished in 2017, after an unsuccessful attempt to save it.

History
Kaskel & Kaskel Co was one of New York's leading haberdasheries, providing shirts for the city's wealthiest gentlemen, including the President of the United States. The company commissioned architect Charles I. Berg to design a new headquarters and retail space at 316 Fifth Avenue in 1902.

Kaskel & Kaskel eventually sold the building and it became home to many small shops. In 2017 it was to be demolished to make way for a 40-story tower. The New York City Landmarks Preservation Commission would not designate it as a landmark because "extensive changes have reduced its historic integrity". Still, preservationists tried to save it.

References

External links
 

Fifth Avenue
Demolished buildings and structures in Manhattan
Commercial buildings completed in 1902
1902 establishments in New York City
Buildings and structures demolished in 2017
2017 disestablishments in New York (state)